Alain Dugrand (16 October 1946, Lyon) is a French journalist, traveler and writer.

Biography 
Alain Dugrand was among the journalists who created the newspaper Libération. As a traveler, he worked for the magazines GEO and National Geographic.

He was the creator and director of the magazine Gulliver from 1990 to 1993.

He launched the "Carrefour des littératures européennes de Strasbourg" (1985) then the  festival of Saint-Malo, with Michel Le Bris.

He presides the Prix Nicolas Bouvier and is also the author of several novels.

Works 
1976: Les Dossiers noirs du racisme dans le Midi de la France, with François Noël Bernardi, Jean Dissler and Alex Panzani, Paris, Éditions du Seuil, series "Combats", 202 p. 
1983: Les Barcelonnettes, volume 1, Les Jardins de l'Alaméda, with Anne Vallaeys, Paris, Fayard, 432 p. 
1984: Le Désemparé, Paris, Éditions JC Lattès, 222 p. 
1985: Les Barcelonnettes, volume 2, Terres Chaudes, with Anne Vallaeys, Fayard, 361 p.  
1987: Les Barcelonnettes, volume 3, La Soldadera, with Anne Vallaeys, Fayard, 308 p. 
1987: Une certaine sympathie, JC Lattès, 177 p. 
 - Prix Roger Nimier 1987
1988: Trotsky. Mexico 1937-1940, Paris, Éditions Payot, seris "Document Payot", 200 p. 
1989: Gloria America, with Michel Antochiw, Éditions JC Lattès, 266 p. 
1989: Mexique, with Patrice Gouy, Michel Antochiw, Paris, Éditions Départ, series "Guides Départ", 114 p. 
1989: La Folie d'Astérion, with Mariwak, Paris, Éditions de La Différence, 
1989: Le Sceptre égaré, with Mariwak, Éditions de La Différence, 
1991: Le Quatorzième Zouave, Paris, Éditions de l'Olivier, 185 p. 
 - Prix Paul Léautaud 1991
 - Prix Louis-Guilloux 1992
1993: Belize, Éditions Payot, series "Voyageur Payot", 228 p. 
1994: Les Craven de l'oncle Ho, Paris, Éditions Grasset, 287 p. 
1996: La Baie des singes, Grasset, 247 p. 
1999: Rue de la République, with Anne Vallaeys, Grasset, 343 p. 
2001: Rhum-limonade, Fayard, 196 p. 
2001: Irak. Dix ans d'embargo, with Jacques Ferrandez, Tournai, Paris, Éditions Casterman, 79 p. 
2004: M'sieur Eddy et moi, Fayard, 208 p. 
2005: Va, vis et deviens, with Radu Mihaileanu, Grasset, 296 p. 
2006: Les Cendres de l'Empire. Voyages du Caucase en Indus, Paris, Éditions Hoëbeke, series "Étonnants voyageurs", 184 p. 
2007: Insurgés, Fayard, 225 p. 
2008: Willi Münzenberg. Artiste en révolution, 1889-1940, with Frédéric Laurent, Fayard, 632 p. + 8 pl. 
2001: Trésor des livres de mer. De Christophe Colomb à Marin-Marie, with Michèle Polak, Éditions Hoëbeke, 279 p. 
 - Prix Le Livre du Nautic 2011
2012: Des livres à la découverte du monde. De Marco Polo à la Croisière jaune, with Michèle Polak, Éditions Hoëbeke, 279 p. 
2013: Libération, un moment d'ivresse : 1973-1981, Éditions Fayard, 350 p.

Documentaire 

References 

20th-century French novelists
21st-century French novelists
20th-century French journalists
Roger Nimier Prize winners
Writers from Lyon
1946 births
Living people